Field of Hope: An Inspiring Autobiography of a Lifetime of Overcoming Odds is a book by former Major League Baseball All-Star outfielder Brett Butler.

References

1997 non-fiction books
Major League Baseball books
Sports autobiographies